Delavar Kola may refer to:
 Delavar Kola, Gatab
 Delavar Kola, Lalehabad